Abhishek Yadav (born 8 June 1995) is an Indian cricketer. He made his first-class debut for Odisha in the 2016–17 Ranji Trophy on 5 November 2016. He made his List A debut for Odisha in the 2016–17 Vijay Hazare Trophy on 25 February 2017.

References

External links
 

1995 births
Living people
Indian cricketers
Odisha cricketers
Sportspeople from Gorakhpur